Harold Weinbrecht (born 1956) is an American computer programmer and politician who has been the mayor of Cary, North Carolina since 2007.

Early life 
Weinbrecht was born in Augusta, Georgia. His family moved to Cary from 1957 to 1967. His uncle was Fred Bond, Jr, the former mayor of Cary.
He attended Augusta College and North Carolina State University, receiving a B.S. in both computer science and mathematics.

Politics 
In 1997, amid disputes between developers and citizens, Weinbrecht launched the website Citizens for Balanced Growth where he wrote about local issues and town council meetings. 

He became the chair of Cary's new Information Services Advisory Board in 1998. In 1999, he was named to Cary’s Planning and Zoning Board. That same year, Weinbrecht was elected to an at-large town council seat.

Though his opponent spent six times more on advertising, Weinbrecht was elected mayor of Cary in 2007, winning approval on 58% of ballots cast over incumbent Ernie McAlister. One of the key issues in the election was growth, with Weinbrecht proposing a balanced approach. During his first term as mayor, Weinbrecht formed the Citizen Issue Review Commission and created a town sustainability manager position. Weinbrecht was re-elected as mayor in 2011, 2015, and 2019. His current term expires in December 2023.

Weinbrecht was endorsed by Indy Week in 2007 and 2011. He started his political career as a Democrat, but now considers himself to be an Independent.

Professional affiliations 
Weinbrecht is a past president of the Wake County Mayors Association. He has also served on the Wake County’s Growth Management Task Force and is chairman of the Capital Area Metropolitan Planning Organization.

Career 
In 1994, he became a programmer for SAS Institute. He was previously a simulations engineer. He retired in 2022 after 28 years at SAS.

Personal life 
Weinbrecht married his wife Belinda and moved back to Cary in 1987. They have two children. He is a member of Cary Presbyterian Church where he teaches Sunday school. He exercises two hours each day.

References

1956 births
Living people
People from Augusta, Georgia
People from Cary, North Carolina
Mayors of Cary, North Carolina
North Carolina Democrats
Augusta State University alumni
North Carolina State University alumni
21st-century American politicians
American computer programmers
American software engineers